Clinton is a city in Hinds County, Mississippi, United States. Situated in the Jackson metropolitan area, it is the tenth largest city in Mississippi. The population was 28,100 at the 2020 United States census.

History

Founded in 1823, Clinton was originally known as Mt. Salus, which means "Mountain of health". It was named for the plantation home of Walter Leake, third governor of Mississippi, which was located in Clinton and built in 1812. The road east from Vicksburg was completed to Mount Salus and the federal government located the district land office at Mount Salus in 1822. The original federal survey in 1822 references a spring called "Swafford's Spring" at the site of the town. In 1828, the city changed its name to Clinton in honor of DeWitt Clinton, the former governor of New York who led completion of the Erie Canal.

The first road through Mount Salus/Clinton was the Natchez Trace, improved from a centuries-old Native American path. Currently Clinton has three major highways that pass through the city: the Natchez Trace Parkway, U.S. Route 80, and Interstate 20.

Mississippi College, a Christian university located in Clinton, is the oldest college in the state of Mississippi. It was founded January 24, 1826, as Hampstead Academy, the second male college in the state after Jefferson College. Mississippi College is the second oldest Baptist university in the world, and was the first coeducational college in the United States to grant a degree to a woman. Clinton is home to sports teams known as the "Clinton Arrows" and "Mississippi College Choctaws". Hillman College, originally for women, was founded in 1853 as Central Female Institute, supported by the Central Baptist Association. It changed its name in 1891. Mount Hermon Female Seminary, a historically black college, was established in 1875 by Sarah Ann Dickey. It closed in 1924 as students moved to co-educational institutions.

The Clinton-Vicksburg Railroad was the second oldest in the state, incorporated in 1831. It contributed to the export of 20,000 bales of cotton annually from this city, the most of any city between Vicksburg and Meridian. Cotton from three surrounding counties was shipped through Clinton and by rail to Grand Gulf on the Mississippi.

During the Civil War, Confederate forces, as well as Union troops— the latter commanded by generals Ulysses S. Grant and Sherman—briefly occupied Clinton on their way to the Battle of Vicksburg in May 1863. Grant had mistakenly believed that John C. Pemberton, a Confederate general, would attack him at Clinton. Grant finally took Vicksburg in this campaign.

Clinton Riot 

In September 1875 during the election campaign, a Republican political rally was held in downtown Clinton, where 3,000 people were gathered expecting Governor Adelbert Ames and other prominent speakers. White insurgents disrupted the rally, attacking blacks in what was called the "Clinton Riot." It resulted in the deaths of several white men and an estimated 50 blacks later that night and over the next few days. More armed whites arrived by train and attacked blacks. Among the black victims were schoolteachers, church leaders, and local Republican organizers.

Whites had been attacking black and white Republicans in every election cycle, and that year the paramilitary Red Shirts arose in the state as a force to intimidate blacks and suppress black voting. The governor appealed to the federal government for protection and the U.S. government sent more troops. But election-related violence continued through the fall and, together with fraud at the polls, resulted in white Democrats regaining control of the state legislature and, in 1876, the governor's seat. This political shift signaled the end of the Reconstruction era, confirmed when the federal government withdrew remaining troops in 1877.

20th century to present
During World War II, Camp Clinton was established as a German POW camp south of town; it housed about 3,000 German soldiers. Most of the prisoners were from the Afrika Korps. Of the 40 German generals captured in the war, Camp Clinton housed 35 of them. The German soldiers provided the labor to build a replica model of the Mississippi River Basin for the U.S. Army Corps of Engineers, used for planning and designing flood prevention.

Clinton, the smallest city to ever host a Fortune 500 company, was the headquarters for WorldCom from the mid-1990s until 2002. WorldCom went bankrupt due to what was at the time the largest accounting scandal in U.S. history. The financial dealings resulted in fraud-related convictions of Bernard Ebbers, CEO, and Scott Sullivan, CFO. The company changed its name to MCI and moved its corporate headquarters location to Ashburn, Virginia. Verizon, MCI's successor, owns SkyTel (no relation to Bell Mobility's Skytel brand). It still occupies the massive former WorldCom compound in Clinton.

On April 15, 2011, an EF3 tornado struck the city at about 11:00 am. CDT. It produced damage near Interstate 20, which included total destruction to the BankPlus building. Malaco Records was destroyed as well. Ten people were injured by the tornado.

Geography

Demographics

Up from 2010's 25,216 people, the city of Clinton had a population of 28,100 people, 9,047 households, and 6,187 families according to the 2020 census. According to the 2020 census, its population was 51.3% non-Hispanic white, 38.1% Black and African American, 0.2% Native American, 4.6% Asian, 3.1% two or more races, and 2.8% Hispanic or Latino of any race.

Government
Clinton operates as a code charter form of government, divided into six Wards. The local governing body consists of the mayor, one Alderman representing each of the six Wards and one Alderman-at-Large whose duty is to represent the entire community.

As of July 3, 2017, Philip R. Fisher, a retired major general in the Mississippi National Guard, is the city's mayor. The Board of Aldermen are Karen Godfrey (Ward 1), Jim Martin (Ward 2), Robert Chapman (Ward 3), Chip Wilbanks (Ward 4), Beverly Oliver (Ward 5), James Lott III (Ward 6) and Ricki Garrett (Alderwoman-At-Large).

Economy
At one point WorldCom (now Verizon) was headquartered in Clinton. In 2003 the company announced that it would move its headquarters to Virginia.

Automotive component manufacturer Delphi Corporation operated a plant in Clinton from the early 1970s until its closure in 2009, making cable and wiring connectors. When Delphi closed the plant in late 2009, with the loss of 280 jobs, production moved to Delphi's Warren, Ohio facility.

Education

Universities and colleges
 Mississippi College founded 1826, incorporating Hillman College 1853–1942
 The local community college is Hinds Community College.

Primary and secondary schools
The city of Clinton's public schools are served by the Clinton Public School District.
 Secondary
 Clinton High School (Grades 10 through 12)
 Sumner Hill Junior High School (Grade 9)
 Clinton Junior High School (Grades 7 and 8)
 Primary
 Lovett Elementary School (Grade 6
 Northside/Eastside Elementary School (Grade 2–5)
 Clinton Park Elementary School (Grades K and 1)

Private schools:
 Clinton Christian Academy (Grades K-4 through 12)
 Mt. Salus Christian School (Grades K-4 through 12)

Public library
Jackson/Hinds Library System operates the Quisenberry Library in Clinton. In 2018 the Clinton city government, citing problems with the sanitary condition, closed the library. It stated that it would reopen if the library system revised the terms of the library lease.

Sports
The Mississippi Brilla is a soccer team competing in USL League Two (PDL), the fourth highest league of the American Soccer Pyramid, and play in the Mid-South Division of the Southern Conference. They play their home games at Traceway Park in the city of Clinton.

Notable people
 Cam Akers – Professional football player (Los Angeles Rams) 
 Mandy Ashford – singer, model, and member of Innosense.
 Lance Bass – pop singer, actor and producer; member of the pop group 'N Sync 
 William Joel Blass, jurist, legislator, and lawyer
 Charles Hillman Brough, governor of Arkansas from 1917 to 1921, was born in Clinton and taught at Mississippi College there
 Keith Carlock, jazz drummer and Mississippi Musicians Hall of Fame inductee, was born in Clinton in 1971.
 Cynthia F. Cooper – auditor, whistleblower
 Ted DiBiase, Sr. – professional wrestler, minister
 Ted DiBiase, Jr. – professional wrestler
 Dominic Douglas – professional football player
 Bernard Ebbers – a Canadian businessman and the co-founder and CEO of WorldCom.
 Jenna Edwards – model, former Miss Teen All-American, former Miss Florida
 Meredith Edwards – country music singer 
 Shelly Fairchild – country music singer
 Taryn Foshee – 2006 Miss Mississippi
 Edgar Godbold – Mississippi College biology professor from 1906 to 1912; later president of two Baptist colleges
 James E. Graves, Jr. – former Supreme Court of Mississippi judge; current United States Court of Appeals for the Fifth Circuit judge
 Barry Hannah – writer, professor
 Jaret Holmes – former Chicago Bears, New York Giants and Jacksonville Jaguars placekicker
 Niesa Johnson – High School All-American, University of Alabama two time All-American, Professional Basketball Player
 Daniel Curtis Lee – actor
 Rory Lee – former vice president and interim president of Mississippi College
 Robert S. McElvaine – writer, professor
 Crystal Renn, plus-size model
 Scott Savage – former drummer of Grammy and Dove award-winning band Jars of Clay
 Leon Seals – former Buffalo Bills and Philadelphia Eagles defensive tackle
 Ruby Jane Smith, bluegrass fiddler
 Jerod Ward – Former highly touted basketball recruit and former professional basketball player

References

External links

 City website
 Journal entry of German POW General Hermann Bernhard Ramcke regarding his time at Camp Clinton
 US Census Bureau Data on Clinton, Mississippi
 City-Data: Clinton, Mississippi

Cities in Mississippi
Cities in Hinds County, Mississippi
Populated places established in 1823
1823 establishments in Mississippi